J-Walk 2007 Mini Album is a mini album by Korean duo male group J-Walk. Composed of former Sechskies members, Kim Jae Duc and Jang Su Won, finally breaks their five-year silence with the release of their new J-Walk 2007 Mini Album. Fans of J-Walk will remember their previous hits such as Suddenly and Someday. Teaming up with talented lyricist Hwang Sung Jin and composer Kim Do Hun, whose previous hits include Lee Hyo Lee's "Toc Toc Toc" and Yangpa's "Knowing You", J-Walk presents the delightful new number " 여우비 (Sunshower)" (Track 1). The song dances to an upbeat medium tempo in contrast to its somber lyrics which lament a lost love. J-Walk graces the cover of J-Walk 2007 Mini Album with a new look of maturity, capturing sophistication in both their styles and music.

Track listing

References

 

2007 albums
J-Walk (South Korean band) albums